The Caulker family of Sierra Leone is an influential family which was established by the English slave trader Thomas Corker.

Family Tree

Notable Caulkers from Sierra leone
Stephen Caulker (died 1810), African Chief
Richard Conray-Ba Caulker, (18??- 1900) African Chief of the Bumpe Chiefdom 1864-1888
Thomas Caulker (1846–1859), son of the above who died in London
 Thomas Neale-Caulker (died 1898), African Chief
 Charles B. Caulker, African Chief
  Steven Caulker , footballer born in England, former Tottenham Hotspur player

References

Sherbro Caulkers